Sabellians is a collective ethnonym for a group of Italic peoples or tribes inhabiting central and southern Italy at the time of the rise of Rome.  The name was first applied by Niebuhr and encompassed the Sabines, Marsi, Marrucini and Vestini. Pliny in one passage says the Samnites were also called Sabelli, and this is confirmed by Strabo. The term  is found also in Livy and other Latin writers, as an adjective form for Samnite, though never for the name of the nation; but it is frequently also used, especially by the poets, simply as an equivalent for the adjective Sabine.

In the modern usage it is also a synonym for the whole, or only a part, of the different Osco-Umbrian peoples and it is supposed it had effectively been their ethnic endonym from an Old Italic root 
 
 Old Italic/Indo-European root  >
 Latin 
 Osco-Umbrian , and consequently:
 Oscan *safno > *safnio > Safinìm > Samnium 
 Sabellic *safio > Safini > Sabini.
For example:
 Oscan  
 Latin .

Strabo in his Geography (V, 3, 1) writes: "The Sabini not only are a very ancient race but are also the indigenous inhabitants (and both the Picentini and the Samnitae are colonists from the Sabini, and the Leucani from the Samnitae, and the Brettii from the Leucani)."

References

Bibliography 
 Smith, William; Dictionary of Greek and Roman Geography, London, (1854)

See also 
 Samnites
 Sabines
 Italic peoples

Ancient Italic peoples